Trembling aspen is an old aspen tree in Konya Province, central Turkey. It is a registered natural monument of the country.

The trembling aspen is located inside the Yakamanastır Nature Park at Bademli village in Beyşehir district of Konya Province. It is a quaking aspen (Populus tremula). Its age is dated to be about 100 years old. Lateral shoots of the old tree are broken by wind.

The tree was registered a natural monument on September 27, 1994.

References

Konya Province
Natural monuments of Turkey
Protected areas established in 1994
1994 establishments in Turkey
Beyşehir District
Individual trees in Turkey